Minnesota was admitted to the Union on May 11, 1858. As of January 3, 2018, the state has had 44 people serve in the United States Senate. Its current U.S. senators are Democrats Amy Klobuchar (since 2007) and Tina Smith (since 2018). The appointment of Smith marked the first time the state had two female U.S. senators at any one time. Knute Nelson is Minnesota's longest-serving senator (1895–1923).

List of senators

|- style="height:2em"
! rowspan=3 | 1
| rowspan=3 align=left | Henry Mower Rice
| rowspan=3  | Democratic
| rowspan=3 nowrap | May 11, 1858 –Mar 3, 1863
| rowspan=3 | Elected in 1858.Retired.
| rowspan=3 | 1
| 
| 1
| Elected in 1858.Lost re-election.
| nowrap | May 11, 1858 –Mar 3, 1859
|  | Democratic
| align=right | James Shields
! 1

|- style="height:2em"
| 
| rowspan=3 | 2
| rowspan=3 | Elected in 1858 or 1859.Lost re-election.
| rowspan=3 nowrap | Mar 4, 1859 –Mar 3, 1865
| rowspan=3  | Republican
| rowspan=3 align=right | Morton S. Wilkinson
! rowspan=3 | 2

|- style="height:2em"
| 

|- style="height:2em"
! rowspan=9 | 2
| rowspan=9 align=left | Alexander Ramsey
| rowspan=9  | Republican
| rowspan=9 nowrap | Mar 4, 1863 –Mar 3, 1875
| rowspan=3 | Elected in 1863.
| rowspan=3 | 2
| 

|- style="height:2em"
| 
| rowspan=6 | 3
| rowspan=3 | Elected in 1865.Died.
| rowspan=3 nowrap | Mar 4, 1865 –Jul 13, 1870
| rowspan=3  | Republican
| rowspan=3 align=right | Daniel S. Norton
! rowspan=3 | 3

|- style="height:2em"
| 

|- style="height:2em"
| rowspan=6 | Re-elected in 1869..
| rowspan=6 | 3
| rowspan=4 

|- style="height:2em"
|  
| nowrap | Jul 13, 1870 –Jul 15, 1870
| colspan=3 | Vacant

|- style="height:2em"
| Appointed to continue Norton's term.Successor qualified.
| nowrap | Jul 15, 1870 –Jan 22, 1871
|  | Republican
| align=right | William Windom
! 4

|- style="height:2em"
| Elected in 1871 to finish Norton's term.Retired.
| nowrap | Jan 23, 1871 –Mar 3, 1871
|  | Republican
| align=right | Ozora P. Stearns
! 5

|- style="height:2em"
| 
| rowspan=3 | 4
| rowspan=3 | Elected in 1871.
| rowspan=6 nowrap | Mar 4, 1871 –Mar 7, 1881
| rowspan=6  | Republican
| rowspan=6 align=right | William Windom
! rowspan=6 | 6

|- style="height:2em"
| 

|- style="height:2em"
! rowspan=10 | 3
| rowspan=10 align=left | Samuel J. R. McMillan
| rowspan=10  | Republican
| rowspan=10 nowrap | Mar 4, 1875 –Mar 3, 1887
| rowspan=3 | Elected in 1875.
| rowspan=3 | 4
| 

|- style="height:2em"
| 
| rowspan=7 | 5
| rowspan=3 | Re-elected in 1877.Resigned to become U.S. Secretary of the Treasury.

|- style="height:2em"
| 

|- style="height:2em"
| rowspan=7 | Re-elected in 1881.Retired.
| rowspan=7 | 5
| rowspan=5 

|- style="height:2em"
|  
| nowrap | Mar 7, 1881 –Mar 12, 1881
| colspan=3 | Vacant

|- style="height:2em"
| Appointed to continue Windom's term.Successor qualified.
| nowrap | Mar 12, 1881 –Oct 30, 1881
|  | Republican
| align=right | Alonzo J. Edgerton
! 7

|- style="height:2em"
|  
| nowrap | Oct 30, 1881 –Nov 15, 1881
| colspan=3 | Vacant

|- style="height:2em"
| Elected in 1881 to finish his own term.Lost election to full term.
| nowrap | Nov 15, 1881 –Mar 3, 1883
|  | Republican
| align=right | William Windom
! 8

|- style="height:2em"
| 
| rowspan=3 | 6
| rowspan=3 | Elected in 1883.Lost renomination.
| rowspan=3 nowrap | Mar 4, 1883 –Mar 3, 1889
| rowspan=3  | Republican
| rowspan=3 align=right | Dwight M. Sabin
! rowspan=3 | 9

|- style="height:2em"
| 

|- style="height:2em"
! rowspan=7 | 4
| rowspan=7 align=left | Cushman Davis
| rowspan=7  | Republican
| rowspan=7 nowrap | Mar 4, 1887 –Nov 27, 1900
| rowspan=3 | Elected in 1886.
| rowspan=3 | 6
| 

|- style="height:2em"
| 
| rowspan=3 | 7
| rowspan=3 | Elected in 1888.Lost re-election.
| rowspan=3 nowrap | Mar 4, 1889 –Mar 3, 1895
| rowspan=3  | Republican
| rowspan=3 align=right | William D. Washburn
! rowspan=3 | 10

|- style="height:2em"
| 

|- style="height:2em"
| rowspan=3 | Re-elected in 1892.
| rowspan=3 | 7
| 

|- style="height:2em"
| 
| rowspan=6 | 8
| rowspan=6 | Elected in 1895.
| rowspan=18 nowrap | Mar 4, 1895 –Apr 28, 1923
| rowspan=18  | Republican
| rowspan=18 align=right | Knute Nelson
! rowspan=18 | 11

|- style="height:2em"
| 

|- style="height:2em"
| Re-elected in 1899.Died.
| rowspan=6 | 8
| rowspan=4 

|- style="height:2em"
| colspan=3 | Vacant
| nowrap | Nov 27, 1900 –Dec 5, 1900
|  

|- style="height:2em"
! 5
| align=left | Charles A. Towne
|  | Democratic
| nowrap | Dec 5, 1900 –Jan 23, 1901
| Appointed to continue Davis's term.Successor qualified.

|- style="height:2em"
! rowspan=9 | 6
| rowspan=9 align=left | Moses E. Clapp
| rowspan=9  | Republican
| rowspan=9 nowrap | Jan 23, 1901 –Mar 3, 1917
| rowspan=3 | Elected in 1901 to finish Davis's term

|- style="height:2em"
| 
| rowspan=3 | 9
| rowspan=3 | Re-elected in 1901.

|- style="height:2em"
| 

|- style="height:2em"
| rowspan=3 | Re-elected in 1905.

| rowspan=3 | 9
| 

|- style="height:2em"
| 
| rowspan=3 | 10
| rowspan=3 | Re-elected in 1907.

|- style="height:2em"
| 

|- style="height:2em"
| rowspan=3 | Re-elected in 1911.Lost renomination.
| rowspan=3 | 10
| 

|- style="height:2em"
| 
| rowspan=3 | 11
| rowspan=3 | Re-elected in 1913.

|- style="height:2em"
| 

|- style="height:2em"
! rowspan=3 | 7
| rowspan=3 align=left | Frank B. Kellogg
| rowspan=3  | Republican
| rowspan=3 nowrap | Mar 4, 1917 –Mar 3, 1923
| rowspan=3 | Elected in 1916.Lost re-election.
| rowspan=3 | 11
| 

|- style="height:2em"
| 
| rowspan=5 | 12
| rowspan=3 | Re-elected in 1918.Died.

|- style="height:2em"
| 

|- style="height:2em"
! rowspan=21 | 8
| rowspan=21 align=left | Henrik Shipstead
| rowspan=16  | Farmer–Labor
| rowspan=21 nowrap | Mar 4, 1923 –Jan 3, 1947
| rowspan=5 | Elected in 1922.
| rowspan=5 | 12
| rowspan=3 

|- style="height:2em"
|  
| nowrap | Apr 28, 1923 –Jul 16, 1923
| colspan=3 | Vacant

|- style="height:2em"
| Elected in 1923 to finish Nelson's term.Lost election to full term.
| nowrap | Jul 16, 1923 –Mar 3, 1925
|  | Farmer–Labor
| align=right | Magnus Johnson
! 12

|- style="height:2em"
| 
| rowspan=3 | 13
| rowspan=3 | Elected in 1924.
| rowspan=6 nowrap | Mar 4, 1925 –Dec 22, 1935
| rowspan=6  | Republican
| rowspan=6 align=right | Thomas D. Schall
! rowspan=6 | 13

|- style="height:2em"
| 

|- style="height:2em"
| rowspan=3 | Re-elected in 1928.
| rowspan=3 | 13
| 

|- style="height:2em"
| 
| rowspan=6 | 14
| rowspan=3 | Re-elected in 1930.Died.

|- style="height:2em"
| 

|- style="height:2em"
| rowspan=8 | Re-elected in 1934.
| rowspan=8 | 14
| rowspan=4 

|- style="height:2em"
|  
| nowrap | Dec 22, 1935 –Dec 27, 1935
| colspan=3 | Vacant

|- style="height:2em"
| Appointed to continue Schall's term.Retired when successor elected.
| nowrap | Dec 27, 1935 –Nov 3, 1936
|  | Farmer–Labor
| align=right | Elmer A. Benson
! 14

|- style="height:2em"
| Elected in 1936 to finish Schall's term.Retired.
| nowrap | Nov 4, 1936 –Jan 3, 1937
|  | Republican
| align=right | Guy V. Howard
! 15

|- style="height:2em"
| 
| rowspan=7 | 15
| rowspan=2 | Elected in 1936.Died.
| rowspan=2 nowrap | Jan 3, 1937 –Aug 31, 1940
| rowspan=2  | Farmer–Labor
| rowspan=2 align=right | Ernest Lundeen
! rowspan=2 | 16

|- style="height:2em"
| rowspan=3 

|- style="height:2em"
|  
| nowrap | Aug 31, 1940 –Oct 14, 1940
| colspan=3 | Vacant

|- style="height:2em"
| rowspan=2 | Appointed to continue Lundeen's term.Retired when successor elected, but elected to next full term.
| rowspan=2 nowrap | Oct 14, 1940 –Nov 17, 1942
| rowspan=2  | Republican
| rowspan=2 align=right | Joseph H. Ball
! rowspan=2 | 17

|- style="height:2em"
| rowspan=5  | Republican
| rowspan=5 | Re-elected in 1940.Lost renomination.
| rowspan=5 | 15
| rowspan=3 

|- style="height:2em"
|  
| nowrap | Nov 17, 1942 –Nov 18, 1942
| colspan=3 | Vacant

|- style="height:2em"
| Elected in 1942 to finish Lundeen's term.Retired.
| nowrap | Nov 18, 1942 –Jan 3, 1943
|  | Republican
| align=right | Arthur E. Nelson
! 18

|- style="height:2em"
| 
| rowspan=3 | 16
| rowspan=3 | Elected in 1942.Lost re-election.
| rowspan=3 nowrap | Jan 3, 1943 –Jan 3, 1949
| rowspan=3  | Republican
| rowspan=3 align=right | Joseph H. Ball
! rowspan=3 | 19

|- style="height:2em"
| 

|- style="height:2em"
! rowspan=6 | 9
| rowspan=6 align=left | Edward John Thye
| rowspan=6  | Republican
| rowspan=6 nowrap | Jan 3, 1947 –Jan 3, 1959
| rowspan=3 | Elected in 1946.
| rowspan=3 | 16
| 

|- style="height:2em"
| 
| rowspan=3 | 17
| rowspan=3 | Elected in 1948.
| rowspan=8 nowrap | Jan 3, 1949 –Dec 29, 1964
| rowspan=8  | DFL
| rowspan=8 align=right | Hubert Humphrey
! rowspan=8 | 20

|- style="height:2em"
| 

|- style="height:2em"
| rowspan=3 | Re-elected in 1952.Lost re-election.
| rowspan=3 | 17
| 

|- style="height:2em"
| 
| rowspan=3 | 18
| rowspan=3 | Re-elected in 1954.

|- style="height:2em"
| 

|- style="height:2em"
! rowspan=7 | 10
| rowspan=7 align=left | Eugene McCarthy
| rowspan=7  | DFL
| rowspan=7 nowrap | Jan 3, 1959 –Jan 3, 1971
| rowspan=4 | Elected in 1958.
| rowspan=4 | 18
| 

|- style="height:2em"
| 
| rowspan=4 | 19
| rowspan=2 | Re-elected in 1960.Resigned to become U.S. Vice President.

|- style="height:2em"
| rowspan=2 

|- style="height:2em"
| rowspan=2 | Appointed to finish Humphrey's term.
| rowspan=7 nowrap | Dec 30, 1964 –Dec 30, 1976
| rowspan=7  | DFL
| rowspan=7 align=right | Walter Mondale
! rowspan=7 | 21

|- style="height:2em"
| rowspan=3 | Re-elected in 1964.Retired.
| rowspan=3 | 19
| 

|- style="height:2em"
| 
| rowspan=3 | 20
| rowspan=3 | Elected to full term in 1966.

|- style="height:2em"
| 

|- style="height:2em"
! rowspan=5 | 11
| rowspan=5 align=left | Hubert Humphrey
| rowspan=5  | DFL
| rowspan=5 nowrap | Jan 3, 1971 –Jan 13, 1978
| rowspan=4 | Elected in 1970.
| rowspan=4 | 20
| 

|- style="height:2em"
| 
| rowspan=8 | 21
| rowspan=2 | Re-elected in 1972.Resigned to become U.S. Vice President.

|- style="height:2em"
| rowspan=2 

|- style="height:2em"
| rowspan=5 | Appointed to finish Mondale's term.Lost election to full term.Resigned early to give successor preferential seniority.
| rowspan=5 nowrap | Dec 30, 1976 –Dec 29, 1978
| rowspan=5  | DFL
| rowspan=5 align=right | Wendell R. Anderson
! rowspan=5 | 22

|- style="height:2em"
| Re-elected in 1976.Died.
| rowspan=7 | 21
| rowspan=5 

|- style="height:2em"
| colspan=3 | Vacant
| nowrap | Jan 13, 1978 –Jan 25, 1978
|  

|- style="height:2em"
! 12
| align=left | Muriel Humphrey
|  | DFL
| nowrap | Jan 25, 1978 –Nov 7, 1978
| Appointed to continue her husband's term.Successor qualified.

|- style="height:2em"
! rowspan=10 | 13
| rowspan=10 align=left | David Durenberger
| rowspan=10  | Independent-Republican
| rowspan=10 nowrap | Nov 7, 1978 –Jan 3, 1995
| rowspan=4 | Elected in 1978 to finish Hubert Humphrey's term.

|- style="height:2em"
| Appointed early to finish Mondale's term, having already been elected to the next term.
| rowspan=7 nowrap | Dec 30, 1978 –Jan 3, 1991
| rowspan=7  | Independent-Republican
| rowspan=7 align=right | Rudy Boschwitz
! rowspan=7 | 23

|- style="height:2em"
| 
| rowspan=3 | 22
| rowspan=3 | Elected in 1978.

|- style="height:2em"
| 

|- style="height:2em"
| rowspan=3 | Re-elected in 1982.
| rowspan=3 | 22
| 

|- style="height:2em"
| 
| rowspan=3 | 23
| rowspan=3 | Re-elected in 1984.Lost re-election.

|- style="height:2em"
| 

|- style="height:2em"
| rowspan=3 | Re-elected in 1988.Retired.
| rowspan=3 | 23
| 

|- style="height:2em"
| 
| rowspan=3 | 24
| rowspan=3 | Elected in 1990.
| rowspan=6 nowrap | Jan 3, 1991 –Oct 25, 2002
| rowspan=6  | DFL
| rowspan=6 align=right | Paul Wellstone
! rowspan=6 | 24

|- style="height:2em"
| 

|- style="height:2em"
! rowspan=3 | 14
| rowspan=3 align=left | Rod Grams
| rowspan=3  | Independent-Republican
| rowspan=3 nowrap | Jan 3, 1995 –Jan 3, 2001
| rowspan=3 | Elected in 1994.Lost re-election.
| rowspan=3 | 24
| 

|- style="height:2em"
| 
| rowspan=5 | 25
| rowspan=3 | Re-elected in 1996.Ran for re-election, but died.

|- style="height:2em"
| 

|- style="height:2em"
! rowspan=5 | 15
| rowspan=5 align=left | Mark Dayton
| rowspan=5  | DFL
| rowspan=5 nowrap | Jan 3, 2001 –Jan 3, 2007
| rowspan=5 | Elected in 2000.Retired.
| rowspan=5 | 25
| rowspan=3 

|- style="height:2em"
|  
| nowrap | Oct 25, 2002 –Nov 4, 2002
| colspan=3 | Vacant

|- style="height:2em"
| Appointed to finish Wellstone's term.Retired when successor was elected to the next full term.
| nowrap | Nov 4, 2002 –Jan 3, 2003
|  | Independence
| align=right | Dean Barkley
! 25

|- style="height:2em"
| 
| rowspan=3 | 26
| rowspan=3 | Elected in 2002.Term expired before election dispute.Lost re-election.
| rowspan=3 nowrap | Jan 3, 2003 –Jan 3, 2009
| rowspan=3  | Republican
| rowspan=3 align=right | Norm Coleman
! rowspan=3 | 26

|- style="height:2em"
| 

|- style="height:2em"
! rowspan=11 | 16
| rowspan=11 align=left | Amy Klobuchar
| rowspan=11  | DFL
| rowspan=11 nowrap | Jan 3, 2007 –Present
| rowspan=4 | Elected in 2006.
| rowspan=4 | 26
| 

|- style="height:2em"
| rowspan=2 
| rowspan=4 | 27
| Election disputed.
| nowrap | Jan 3, 2009 –Jul 7, 2009
| colspan=3 | Vacant

|- style="height:2em"
| rowspan=3 | Elected in 2008, but was taking certified validity in 2009.
| rowspan=5 nowrap | Jul 7, 2009 –Jan 2, 2018
| rowspan=5  | DFL
| rowspan=5 align=right | Al Franken
! rowspan=5 | 27

|- style="height:2em"
| 

|- style="height:2em"
| rowspan=4 | Re-elected in 2012.
| rowspan=4 | 27
| 

|- style="height:2em"
| 
| rowspan=4 | 28
| rowspan=2 | Re-elected in 2014.Resigned.

|- style="height:2em"
| rowspan=2 

|- style="height:2em"
| rowspan=2 | Appointed to continue Franken's term.Elected in 2018 to finish Franken's term.
| rowspan=5 nowrap | Jan 3, 2018 –Present
| rowspan=5  | DFL
| rowspan=5 align=right | Tina Smith
! rowspan=5 | 28

|- style="height:2em"
| rowspan=3 | Re-elected in 2018.
| rowspan=3 | 28
| 

|- style="height:2em"
| 
| rowspan=3 | 29
| rowspan=3 | Re-elected in 2020.

|- style="height:2em"
| 

|- style="height:2em"
| rowspan=2 colspan=5 | To be determined in the 2024 election.
| rowspan=2|29
| 

|- style="height:2em"
| 
| 30
| colspan=5 | To be determined in the 2026 election.

See also

 United States congressional delegations from Minnesota
 List of United States representatives from Minnesota
 Elections in Minnesota

Notes

External links
 Biographical Directory of the U.S. Congress
 Chronological list of U.S. senators

 
United States Senators
Minnesota
United States Senate